Ancylobothrys capensis, the wild apricot, is a tangled, sprawling, multi-stemmed Southern African creeper of the family Apocynaceae.

It is evergreen, often scrambling over rocks and other plants. New growth is covered in velvety, reddish-brown hairs. When damaged it exudes copious amounts of white latex. The leathery leaves are broadly elliptic, simple, opposite and erect, with prominent venation on both surfaces. Flowers are fragrant, about 40mm diameter, brilliant white when open and pinkish in bud.

The round fruit are up to 50mm in diameter, khaki-green when immature, turning bright orange or yellow when ripe. The skin is thick, soft, brittle, and easily peeled. 3-4 seeds are embedded in a sweet and tasty acidic pulp.

The species is common and occurs in rocky areas, particularly on quartzites throughout KwaZulu-Natal, Mpumalanga, Gauteng, Limpopo Province, North West Province and Botswana.

References

External links
 

capensis
Fruits originating in Africa
Flora of South Africa
Plants described in 1877